A serrated blade is one with a toothlike rather than a plain edge, and is used on saws and on some knives and scissors. It is also known as a dentated, sawtooth, or toothed blade. Most such blades are scalloped, having edges cut with curved notches, common on wood saws and bread knives. 

Serrations give the blade's cutting edge less contact area than a smooth blade, which increases the applied pressure at each point of contact, and the points of contact are at a sharper angle to the material being cut. This causes a cutting action that involves many small splits in the surface of the material being cut, which cumulatively serve to cut the material along the line of the blade. 

Cuts made with a serrated blade are typically less smooth and precise than cuts made with a smooth blade. Serrated edges can be difficult to sharpen using a whetstone or rotary sharpener intended for straight edges but can be sharpened with ceramic or diamond coated rods. Further, they tend to stay sharper longer than similar straight edges. A serrated blade has a faster cut, but a plain edge has a cleaner cut. Some prefer a serrated blade on a pocket knife.

Types of serration
 Tooth serration — Vertical serration along edge of blade
 Single edge serration — Serration on one side, the other remains flat
 Double edge serration — Serration on both sides
 Fan serration — Side-to-side serration without necessarily having a toothed edge
 Micro-serration — Serration much smaller than thickness of blade creating something like a fan pattern

References

External links
 "The Serrated Bread Knife," Chronicle of Early American Industries, 2010 - article documenting the production of American serrated knives and saw-cut knives back as far as 1838.

Cutting tools